Fear is a 1990 American thriller/horror/suspense film. It is directed by Rockne S. O'Bannon and stars Ally Sheedy, Pruitt Taylor Vince, Michael O'Keefe, Lauren Hutton, Keone Young, Stan Shaw, Dean Goodman, Don Hood and Jonathan Prince.

Plot
Cayce Bridges (Ally Sheedy) is a psychic gifted in a form of remote viewing and empathy/telepathy that allows her to mentally link with murderers enabling police to catch them. That is until she encounters the mysterious and elusive Shadow Man (Pruitt Taylor Vince), who is not only similarly blessed, but is more powerful than she is.

Cast
 Ally Sheedy as Cayce Bridges
 Michael O'Keefe as Jack Hays
 Lauren Hutton as Jessica Moreau
 Pruitt Taylor Vince as "Shadow Man"
 Keone Young as Detective William Wu
 Stan Shaw as Detective Webber
 Jonathan Prince as Colin Hart
 Dina Merrill as Catherine Tarr
 John Agar as Leonard Scott Levy
 Marta DuBois as Inez Villanueva
 Dean Goodman as William Tarr
 Don Hood as Holcomb
 Jane Sibbett as Newscaster

Release
Originally intended for a theatrical release, the film made its premiere on Showtime on July 15, 1990.

DVD
The film has been released on DVD by Lions Gate as a double feature with Parents.  Both films are presented in widescreen.

Reception
Alan Jones of Radio Times awarded the film three stars out of five.

References

External links

1990 films
1990 horror films
1990s horror thriller films
American horror thriller films
Films with screenplays by Rockne S. O'Bannon
1990s supernatural thriller films
American supernatural horror films
Vestron Pictures films
Films scored by Henry Mancini
Films about fear
1990s English-language films
1990s American films